Peru competed at the 2004 Summer Olympics in Athens, Greece, from 13 to 29 August 2004. This was the nation's fifteenth appearance at the Olympics, except the 1952 Summer Olympics in Helsinki.

Comité Olímpico Peruano sent the nation's smallest ever team to the Games since the 1956 Summer Olympics in Melbourne. A total of twelve athletes, seven men and five women, competed in ten different sports. Two athletes from the Peruvian team had previously competed in Sydney: butterfly swimmer Juan Pablo Valdivieso and 1984 Olympic silver medalist Francisco Boza in men's trap shooting (who became the first Peruvian athlete to participate in seven Olympic Games, surpassing a single edition short of a historic record by fellow shooter Juan Giha). Being the oldest and most sophisticated member of the team, Boza was assigned by the committee to become the nation's flag bearer in the opening ceremony. Peru, however, failed to win a single Olympic medal since the 1992 Summer Olympics in Barcelona, where Giha won the silver in the mixed skeet.

Athletics

Peruvian athletes have so far achieved qualifying standards in the following athletics events (up to a maximum of 3 athletes in each event at the 'A' Standard, and 1 at the 'B' Standard).

 Key
 Note – Ranks given for track events are within the athlete's heat only
 Q = Qualified for the next round
 q = Qualified for the next round as a fastest loser or, in field events, by position without achieving the qualifying target
 NR = National record
 N/A = Round not applicable for the event
 Bye = Athlete not required to compete in round

Men
Field events

Women
Track & road events

Badminton

Rowing

Peruvian rowers qualified the following boats:

Men

Qualification Legend: FA=Final A (medal); FB=Final B (non-medal); FC=Final C (non-medal); FD=Final D (non-medal); FE=Final E (non-medal); FF=Final F (non-medal); SA/B=Semifinals A/B; SC/D=Semifinals C/D; SE/F=Semifinals E/F; R=Repechage

Sailing

Peruvian sailors have qualified one boat for each of the following events.

Open

M = Medal race; OCS = On course side of the starting line; DSQ = Disqualified; DNF = Did not finish; DNS= Did not start; RDG = Redress given

Shooting 

One Peruvian shooter qualified to compete in the following events:

Men

Swimming

Peruvian swimmers earned qualifying standards in the following events (up to a maximum of 2 swimmers in each event at the A-standard time, and 1 at the B-standard time):

Men

Women

Table tennis

Peru has qualified a single table tennis player.

Tennis

Peru nominated a male tennis player to compete in the tournament.

Weightlifting 

Peru has qualified a single weightlifter.

Wrestling 

 Key
  – Victory by Fall.
  - Decision by Points - the loser with technical points.
  - Decision by Points - the loser without technical points.

Men's Greco-Roman

See also
 Peru at the 2003 Pan American Games
 Peru at the 2004 Summer Paralympics

References

External links
Official Report of the XXVIII Olympiad
Peruvian Olympic Committee 

Nations at the 2004 Summer Olympics
2004 Summer Olympics
Summer Olympics